Simonestus is a genus of corinnid sac spiders first described by A. B. Bonaldo in 2000.

Species
 it contains six species in the Americas:
Simonestus occidentalis (Schenkel, 1953) – Venezuela
Simonestus pseudobulbulus (Caporiacco, 1938) – Guatemala
Simonestus robustus (Chickering, 1937) – Panama
Simonestus semiluna (F. O. Pickard-Cambridge, 1899) – Mexico, Guatemala
Simonestus separatus (Schmidt, 1971) – Guatemala to Peru
Simonestus validus (Simon, 1898) (type) – Venezuela

References

Araneomorphae genera
Corinnidae
Spiders of North America
Spiders of South America